Elections to Kirklees Metropolitan Borough Council were held on 7 May 1998.  One third of the council was up for election and the Labour party kept overall control of the council.

After the election, the composition of the council was
Labour 43
Liberal Democrat 20
Conservative 7
Green Party 2

Election result

References

1998 English local elections
1998
1990s in West Yorkshire